In the 1970–71 season Panathinaikos played for 12th consecutive time in Greece's top division, the Alpha Ethniki. They also competed in the European Cup, being the finalists, and the Greek Cup

Squad

Team kit

Competitions

Alpha Ethniki

Classification

European Cup
First round

|}
Second round

|}
Quarter-finals

|}
Semi-finals

|}

Final

Intercontinental Cup
Panathinaikos played also for the Intercontinental Cup against Club Nacional de Football due to refusal of Ajax to participate.

First leg

Match details

Second leg

Match details

References

External links
 Panathinaikos FC official website

Panathinaikos F.C. seasons
Panathinaikos